The University of Tulsa (TU) is a private research university in Tulsa, Oklahoma. It has a historic affiliation with the Presbyterian Church and the campus architectural style is predominantly Collegiate Gothic. The school traces its origin to the Presbyterian School for Girls, which was established in 1882 in Muskogee, Oklahoma, then a town in Indian Territory, and which evolved into an institution of higher education named Henry Kendall College by 1894. The college moved to Tulsa, another town in the Creek Nation during 1904, before the state of Oklahoma was created. In 1920, Kendall College was renamed the University of Tulsa.   

The University of Tulsa is classified among "R2: Doctoral Universities – High research activity". It manages the Gilcrease Museum, which includes one of the largest collections of American Western art and indigenous American artifacts in the world. The Bob Dylan Archive TU houses at the Helmerich Center for American Research. TU also hosts the Tulsa Studies in Women's Literature, founded by former TU professor and noted feminist critic Germaine Greer (now at the University of Cambridge).

TU's athletic teams are collectively known as the Tulsa Golden Hurricane and compete in Division I of the NCAA as members of the American Athletic Conference (The American).

History

Frontier Origins
The Presbyterian School for Girls (also known as "Minerva Home") was founded in Muskogee, Indian Territory, in 1882 to offer a primary education to young women of the Creek Nation.

In 1894, the young school expanded to become Henry Kendall College, named in honor of Reverend Henry Kendall, secretary of the Presbyterian Board of Home Missions. The first president was William A. Caldwell, who served a brief two-year term, which ended in 1896.

Caldwell was succeeded by William Robert King, a Presbyterian minister and co-founder of the college, who had come to Oklahoma from Tennessee, by way of the Union Theological Seminary in New York City (affiliated with Columbia University). Kendall College, while still in Muskogee, granted the first post-secondary degree in Oklahoma in June 1898.  Under King, the college was moved from its original location in downtown Muskogee to a larger campus on lands donated by Creek Nation Chief Pleasant Porter.

Kendall College students, faculty and administrators were instrumental in efforts to get the State of Sequoyah recognized; they wrote most of the proposed constitution and designed the seal among other things.

The opening of the new campus coincided with the start of the tenure of the third president, A. Grant Evans.  Over the next ten years, Evans oversaw the struggling school's growth. In most years, class sizes remained small and although the academy, the attached elementary, middle, and high school was more successful; by the end of the 1906–07 year Kendall College had had only 27 collegiate graduates. At the request of the administration, the Synod of Indian Territory assumed control as trustees and began to look at alternatives for the future of the school. When the administration was approached by the comparatively smaller town of Tulsa and offered a chance to move, the decision was made to relocate.<ref>{{cite web|last=Carlson|first=Marc|title=Encyclopedia of Oklahoma History & Culture|website=Oklahoma Historical Society|access-date=May 3, 2012|url=http://digital.library.okstate.edu/encyclopedia/entries/U/UN014.html|archive-url=https://web.archive.org/web/20100729192600/http://digital.library.okstate.edu/encyclopedia/entries/U/UN014.html |archive-date=July 29, 2010 }}</ref>

Relocation to Tulsa
The Tulsa Commercial Club (a forerunner of the Tulsa Chamber of Commerce) decided to bid for the college. Club members who packaged a bid in 1907 to move the college to Tulsa included: B. Betters, H. O. McClure, L. N. Butts, W. L. North, James H. Hall (sic), Grant C. Stebbins, Rev. Charles W. Kerr, C. H. Nicholson. The offer included $100,000, 20 acres of real estate and a guarantee for utilities and street car service.

The college opened to thirty-five students in September 1907, two months before Oklahoma became a state. These first students attended classes at the First Presbyterian Church until permanent buildings could be erected on the new campus. This became the start of higher education in Tulsa. Kendall Hall, the first building of the new school, was completed in 1908 and was quickly followed by two other buildings. All three buildings have since been demolished, with Kendall the last to be razed in 1972. The bell that once hung in the Kendall Building tower was saved and displayed in Bayless Plaza.

The Kendall College presidents during 1907–1919 were Arthur Grant Evans, Levi Harrison Beeler, Seth Reed Gordon, Frederick William Hawley, Ralph J. Lamb, Charles Evans, James G. McMurtry and Arthur L. Odell.

In 1918, the Methodist Church proposed building a college in Tulsa, using money donated by Tulsa oilman Robert M. McFarlin. The proposed college was to be named McFarlin College. However, it was soon apparent that Tulsa could not yet support two competing schools. In 1920, Henry Kendall College merged with the proposed McFarlin College to become The University of Tulsa. The McFarlin Library of TU was named for the principal donor of the proposed college. The name of Henry Kendall has lived on to the present as the Kendall College of Arts and Sciences.

20th century
The University of Tulsa opened its School of Petroleum Engineering in 1928.

The Great Depression hit the university hard. By 1935, the school was about to close because of its poor financial condition. It had a debt of $250,000, enrollment had fallen to 300 students (including many who could not pay their own tuition), the faculty was poorly paid and morale was low. It was then that the oil tycoon and TU-patron Waite Phillips offered the school presidency to Clarence Isaiah ("Cy") Pontius, a former investment banker. His primary focus would be to rescue the school's finances. A deans' council would take charge of academic issues.

However, Pontius' accomplishments went beyond raising money. During his tenure the following events occurred:
In 1935, the university opened the College of Business Administration, which it renamed as the Collins College of Business Administration in 2008.
The Tulsa Law School, located in downtown Tulsa, became part of the university in 1943.
In 1948, oil magnate William G. Skelly donated funds to found the university radio station, KWGS (named for his initials).

After William G. Skelly died, his widow donated the Skelly Mansion, at the corner of 21st Street and Madison Avenue, to the University of Tulsa. The school sold the mansion and its furnishings to private owners in 1959. On July 5, 2012, the university announced that it would repurchase the house as a residence for its president.

In 1958, Ben Graf Henneke, a scholar of theater and communications, became the first alumnus to hold the Presidency of the University of Tulsa.  During his tenure the university established new doctoral programs, increased the proportion of faculty with doctorates, started new publications including Petroleum Abstracts and the James Joyce Quarterly, developed a North Campus center for petroleum engineering research, and expanded many main campus facilities. He was succeeded by Dr. Eugene L. Swearingen, a Stanford University-trained economist and Oklahoma native who served on the National Finance Committee for the Jimmy Carter Presidential Campaign.  Swearingen increased TU's endowment and expanded the footprint of its campus.

21st century
In 2004, anthropologist Steadman Upham joined the University of Tulsa as president, having served in faculty and leadership positions at the University of Oregon and Arizona State University. Within five years of his arrival, TU saw thirteen major construction projects and renovations on campus, ranging from the construction of the Roxana Rozsa and Robert Eugene Lorton Performance Center to the overhaul of Keplinger Hall, and plans for seven more major projects finalized (despite the nationwide recession).

The university also launched the Oxley College of Health Sciences, in downtown Tulsa, named in recognition of a major gift from Tulsa's Oxley Foundation. The university also partnered with the George Kaiser Family Foundation to permanently house The Bob Dylan Archive at TU in 2016. Under Upham's leadership, the University of Tulsa assumed management of the famous Gilcrease Museum in northwest Tulsa.

In 2016 President Upham retired and was succeeded by Dr. Gerard Clancy who previously served as a psychiatry professor and held leadership positions at the University of Iowa and the University of Oklahoma. About two-and-a-half years into his presidency, in the spring of 2019, President Clancy and Provost Levit announced a restructuring of academic programs at the university that would eliminate several academic programs. The plan was met with resistance from some faculty who believed it was formulated without adequate input from faculty. Although faculty members voted "no confidence" in the president and provost in November, the university's board of trustees publicly affirmed their support of the plan.

In January 2020, President Clancy informed the Board that he needed to cut back his activities because of unspecified medical issues. The Board named Provost Levit as Interim President of the school, effective in January 2020. 

Former Congressman Brad Carson became President of Tulsa University, effective July 1, 2021. He replaced Interim President, Janet K. Levit.

Academics
University of Tulsa offers liberal arts, sciences, and professional programs, including engineering, English, computer science, natural sciences, clinical and industrial/organizational psychology, and other disciplines.

The university also maintains a college of law, which is one of the few to specialize in Native American legal issues.

The Tulsa Law Review ranks in the top 15% of most cited legal periodicals as ranked by Washington and Lee University.

The university's graduate program in petroleum engineering is ranked #5 among all national universities according to 2021 rankings from U.S. News & World Report

The university has an undergraduate research program, evidenced by 44 students receiving Goldwater Scholarships since 1995. The Tulsa Undergraduate Research Challenge (TURC) allows undergraduates to conduct advanced research with the guidance of top TU professors.

There are six colleges at the University of Tulsa:
 Kendall College of Arts & Sciences
 Collins College of Business (formerly College of Business Administration)
 College of Engineering and Natural Sciences
 College of Law
 Oxley College of Health Sciences
 Graduate School

Admission to TU is highly competitive; The 2014 freshman class boasted an average ACT score of 30 and an incoming average GPA of 3.9, the highest in the university's history.

The Tulsa Institute for Trauma, Adversity and Injustice is an interdisciplinary institute committed to evidence-based education, scholarship, research, and service that reduce the incidence and impact of trauma and adversity.  This group is composed of students and professors primarily in psychology, sociology, and nursing.  The group contributes to the fields through presentations at local and major conferences and publications.

RankingsU.S. News & World Reports 2022 edition of "Best Colleges" ranked the University of Tulsa 136 among "national universities" and tied at 79th for "Best Value". The university's graduate school program in petroleum engineering was ranked #5.

Scholarship and fellowship recipients
TU students have won 66 Goldwater Scholarships, five Marshall Scholarships, three Rhodes Scholarships (9 Rhodes finalists), 25 Fulbright Scholarships, and numerous Department of Defense, National Science Foundation, and Morris K. Udall Fellowships.

Campus
The campus of the University of Tulsa centers on a wide, grassy, quad-like space known as Dietler Commons, formerly called "The U." The predominant architectural style is English Gothic. Most of the buildings are constructed from tan and rose-colored Crab Orchard sandstone from Tennessee interspersed with stone quarried in Arkansas. Other materials include Bedford limestone from Indiana and slate quarried in Vermont. The university's campus borders Tulsa's Kendall-Whittier neighborhood and is not far from Tulsa's downtown and mid-town neighborhoods.  The campus, in particular its football venue Skelly Field, is located on the historic U.S. Route 66, America's "Mother Road" stretching from Chicago to Los Angeles.

University of Tulsa has participated in efforts towards sustainability including RecycleMania and Adopt a Recycle Bin. Many campus efforts have been led by student groups like the Sustainability Committee, the Association of International Students, Student Association, TU Earth Matters, and the TU Food Garden. The university strives to have its buildings meet LEED standards in order to reduce the school's overall carbon footprint.

Bayless Plaza
Completed in 2006, Bayless Plaza houses the Kendall Bell, hanging in the cupola of the former Kendall Hall. The plaza lies directly south of Tyrrell Hall, longtime home of the School of Music, and serves as the apex of Tucker Drive, the university's main entrance.

Skelly Field at H. A. Chapman Stadium

Tulsa Golden Hurricane football has played home games at Skelly Field at H. A. Chapman Stadium since 1930. It was renamed from Skelly Stadium following renovations in 2007. The Case Athletic Complex in the north end of the field provides office facilities for the football staff, a new locker room and trainer facility, a letterman's lounge and box seating on the top level, and meeting rooms, a computer lab, and study spaces for student-athletes. Renovations provide seating throughout the stadium, new turf, an updated score board and Jumbotron, and an expanded press box. The changes also include the addition of an extensive plaza area (Thomas Plaza) on the west side of the stadium to accommodate restrooms, food and drink stands, and souvenir shops.

Donald W. Reynolds Center
Home to women's volleyball along with the men's and women's basketball programs, the Donald W. Reynolds Center houses office and meeting space, practice and weights facilities, and the main basketball arena. Commencement exercises are held in the Reynolds Center in May.

Sharp Chapel

Named for its principal donors, Mr. and Mrs. Robert C. Sharp, Sharp Chapel was completed on November 27, 1959. It replaced the university's original chapel that was located in Kendall Hall before its destruction and replacement by the current Kendall Hall theater building. Sharp Chapel houses the Offices of University Chaplain and serves the religious needs of multiple denominations present on campus as well as hosting many awards ceremonies and weddings.

Additions to Sharp Chapel were completed in the spring of 2004, including the Westminster Room, an atrium, kitchen, and a second floor including administrative offices and a conference room.

On-campus student residences
On-campus housing consists of six residence halls, six sorority houses, and six university-owned apartment complexes, including eight apartments designed like townhouses.

Residence halls:
 John Mabee Hall – all-male residence hall located at the Northwest end of Dietler Commons. It is known on campus as "The John".
 Lottie Jane Mabee Hall – all-female residence hall located at the Southwest end of Deitler Commons. It is known on campus as "Lottie."
 LaFortune Hall – coed residence hall close to the athletics areas. It is home to the university's International Living Community. It is named for the family of three Tulsa mayors.
 William F. Fisher Hall – coed freshman residence hall immediately adjacent to the facility formerly known as Twin Towers, first opened to students in the fall of 1984. It was known as Twin South from 1984 to 2009. It is now known on campus as "South" or "Fisher South."
 Fisher West Suites – coed residence hall immediately adjacent to the Dining Hall and part of the building formerly known as Twin Towers. It is known on campus as "West" or "Fisher West."
 Hardesty Hall – coed residence hall suites close to Allen Chapman Student Union.

Apartment complexes include Brown Village, Lorton Village (includes townhouses), Mayo Village, Norman Village, University Square South, and University Square West.

Museums and libraries

McFarlin Library: Resources and Notable Collections

At the top of Deitler Commons sits one of the campus' most notable landmarks, the McFarlin Library, named after Robert and Ida McFarlin, the library's primary benefactors. The McFarlins had only one stipulation with their gift: that the view of Downtown Tulsa from McFarlin could never be blocked. Groundbreaking ceremonies took place on May 3, 1929, and the edifice was dedicated on June 1, 1930. The library continued to grow over the years, adding a five-story addition in 1967, an underground stacks area in by 1979, and technology wing in 2007.  The library contains over two million items.

Currently, the library's Department of Special Collections and University Archives houses over twelve million archival items and has over a thousand collections on a wide-ranging array of topics including 20th-century British, Irish, and American literature, which includes the world's second largest collection of materials by James Joyce. It also houses the papers of Nobel Prize winners V.S. Naipaul and Doris Lessing, as well as novelists and poets Jean Rhys, Eliot Bliss, David Plante, Anna Kavan, and Stevie Smith, just to name a few. In addition to these famous novelists, McFarlin Library's houses the papers of Congresswoman Alice Mary Robertson, literary critic Richard Ellmann, comic book innovator E. Nelson Bridwell, Cherokee Principal Chief J.B. Milam, and writer/sexologist Edward Charles, among others.  The Department of Special Collections also contains a vast collection of books on Native American history.

Partnership with the Gilcrease Museum
In July 2008, the University of Tulsa took over management of the Gilcrease Museum in a public-private partnership with the City of Tulsa. The museum has one of the largest collections of American Western art in the world (including famous works by Frederic Remington, Thomas Moran, and others) and houses growing collections in artifacts from Central and South America.

The Bob Dylan Archive
The Bob Dylan Archive is a collection of documents and objects relating to iconic American singer-songwriter Bob Dylan (whose mentor was Oklahoman Woody Guthrie). It was announced on March 2, 2016, that the archive had been acquired by the George Kaiser Family Foundation (GKFF) and the University of Tulsa. The university has since relinquished ownership to GKFF. It will be under the care of the university's Helmerich Center for American Research.

Student body and student life

Students at the University of Tulsa represent 46 states and over 60 foreign countries,  of which 54% are Oklahoma residents. Among the most common countries of origin for TU international students are China, Saudi Arabia, Kuwait, India, Nigeria, Angola and the United Kingdom.

The University of Tulsa is home to more than 150 student organizations, registered with and partially funded by the Student Association.

Diversity and campus life
A number of groups exist to support diversity on the University of Tulsa campus. There at least 25 campus organizations existing to support and sustain a diverse campus community. In addition, TU hosts the Chevron Multicultural Resource Center, funded by a gift from the energy company, which hosts events and programming to promote diversity on campus.

Although TU has historic ties to the Presbyterian Church, the university has long embraced religious diversity.  In 2002, TU was home to the first mosque built on an American university campus. TU also hosts a chapter of Hillel International, an organization to support Jewish life on campus. The university also hosts a number of organizations reflecting different streams of Christian spiritual practice, including Protestant, Catholic and Orthodox.

Student Association
The Student Association is the University of Tulsa student government body. It is organized into three branches: the Executive Branch, which includes Cabinet and is in charge of organizing large campus-wide events and activities; the Judicial Branch; and the Legislative Branch, or Student Senate, which coordinates funding, supports student organization charters, and addresses general issues impacting student life on campus. Its budget is provided partially by the university and partially by a fee paid by students each semester.

Traditionally, the Student Association coordinates Homecoming activities, including cross campus competitions and the homecoming game tailgate. Another traditional event is Springfest, a week-long series of events including food, various on-campus activities, and a concert bringing in such names as Imagine Dragons, Panic! At the Disco, and Ben Rector. In addition to traditional campus events, Student Association provides smaller campus programs including community service activities, social awareness events, and diversity programming. Activities organized by Student Association are free to all TU students.

College traditions
 Kendall Bell: The Kendall Bell, now housed in Bayless Plaza, is traditionally rung by graduating seniors upon completion of their last final exam at the university. The bell was broken by a group of students in May 2008. They were trying to steal it, and dropped it in their escape.
 Homecoming Bonfire: Traditionally held the Friday evening prior to the Homecoming football game. The Homecoming court is honored along with the Jess Chouteau Top Ten Seniors.
 Alma mater: "Hail to Tulsa U" is sung by alumni and current students prior to major sporting events and at the end of all commencement ceremonies. Alumni and students remain standing as a sign of respect. The melody is played by the Sharp Chapel carillon daily at 5 pm.

Greek life
There are six IFC fraternities and six NPC sororities on campus. The living quarters in the back of the sorority houses are university-owned residence halls, but, traditionally, only current members of the sororities live there.

Other fraternities on campus that do not fall under the various councils include:
 Alpha Phi Omega co-ed service fraternity
 Phi Mu Alpha Sinfonia music fraternity
 Sigma Alpha Iota music sorority
 Delta Theta Phi co-ed law fraternity
 Phi Alpha Delta co-ed law fraternity
 Phi Delta Phi co-ed law fraternity
 Sigma Phi Lambda Christian sorority
 Beta Upsilon Chi Christian fraternity

2015 student speech controversy
In February 2015, after the University of Tulsa suspended a student under its zero tolerance policy for harassment for allegedly threatening and defamatory Facebook postings by his fiancée against other faculty and a female student, administrators attempted to discourage the campus newspaper from publishing confidential information because of the non-disclosure agreement the suspended student and university had entered into.   The controversy was picked up by several online sites which criticized the administration for using "threats" and "intimidation" to "cover up" their handling of the disciplinary issue. In January 2016, the former student filed a lawsuit against the university, claiming his dismissal was unfair and was a breach of the institution's commitment to due process. The incident earned the university a spot on the Foundation for Individual Rights in Education's 2016 "10 Worst Colleges for Free Speech". The lawsuit was dismissed in favor of the university in 2021.

Athletics

Tulsa's sports teams participate in NCAA Division I as a member of the American Athletic Conference (The American); its football team is part of the Football Bowl Subdivision (FBS). Tulsa has the smallest undergraduate enrollment of any FBS school. TU has had a rivalry with the slightly larger Rice University and a football rivalry with the substantially larger University of Houston. It also has two current rivalries with D-I schools that do not sponsor football—an in-conference rivalry with Wichita State University, especially in men's basketball, and a crosstown rivalry, most prominently in basketball, with Summit League member Oral Roberts University.

The university's nickname is the Golden Hurricane (it was originally the Golden Tornadoes). The Sound of the Golden Hurricane marching band plays at all home football and basketball games as well as traveling to championships in support of the Golden Hurricane. Tulsa has won six national championships (three NCAA): four in women's golf and two in men's basketball. The University of Tulsa currently fields a varsity team in seven men's sports and ten women's sports.

Athletic facilities are distributed throughout a number of buildings on campus. Mabee Gym houses an extensive indoor rowing facility, an indoor golf practice facility, and volleyball practice gyms. Renovations in spring 2008 incorporated FieldTurf into an indoor practice field for the soccer, softball, and football programs. The tennis teams are housed in the Michael D. Case Tennis Center, which includes a number of indoor and outdoor courts (and spectator seating for 2,000). The Hurricane Soccer & Track Stadium is home to the track and field and soccer programs.

Symbols
The school's colors are old gold (PMS 4525), royal blue (PMS 288), and crimson (PMS 186).

The university's original motto was, in full: "Faith, Wisdom, Service: For Christ, For State."

Publications
The University of Tulsa Collegian is the long-standing independent and student-run newspaper on campus.

The following scholarly journals are published by the university:
 Nimrod International Journal of Prose and Poetry James Joyce Quarterly Tulsa Studies in Women's Literature Lithic Technology Russian Studies in History  Energy Law Journal Tulsa Journal of Comparative & International Law Tulsa Law ReviewIn 2003 Tulsa joined the efforts of Brown University on the Modernist Journals Project, an online archive of early 20th-century periodicals. Tulsa has contributed various modernist texts from McFarlin Library's Special Collections to the project's website.

Dr. Sean Latham, editor of the James Joyce Quarterly, brought the 2003 North American James Joyce Conference to the University of Tulsa.

Notable people

Alumni

The University of Tulsa counts a number of distinguished individuals among its alumni, including current Walmart CEO Doug McMillon, New York School poet Ted Berrigan, The Outsiders author S.E. Hinton, voicemail inventor Gordon Matthews, Golden Girls'' actress Rue McClanahan, actor Peter McRobbie, roboticist and author Daniel H. Wilson, radio legend Paul Harvey, Kuwaiti Petroleum Company CEO Hani Abdulaziz Al Hussein, TV personality Dr. Phil McGraw (who played football for TU but did not graduate), Cherokee Nation Chief Chad "Corntassel" Smith, botanist and ecologist Harriet George Barclay, US Congressman and Pro Football Hall of Fame wide receiver Steve Largent, NBA basketball player Steve Bracey, and Brazilian billionaire businessman Ermirio Pereira de Moraes; HE Suhail Al Mazroui, Minister of Energy & Industry for the United Arab Emirates, member of the Supreme Petroleum Council, and sits on the executive committee and other sections of Mubadala Investment Company .

Faculty
A number of notable individuals have served on the University of Tulsa's faculty over the years. Current notable faculty members include psychologist Robert Hogan, political scientist Robert Donaldson, Catholic philosopher F. Russell Hittinger, computer scientist Sujeet Shenoi, and former US Congressman Brad Carson. Noted artist Adah Robinson was the founder and first chairperson of the university's Department of Art. Several renowned literary figures and critics have served on Tulsa's faculty, including feminist pioneer Germaine Greer, Booker-prize winning novelist Paul Scott, author and critic Darcy O'Brien, and the famous Russian poet and dissident intellectual Yevgeny Yevtushenko until his death in 2017. Other notable former faculty members include legal scholars Paul Finkelman and Larry Catá Backer, psychologist Brent Roberts, painter Alexandre Hogue, Catholic Bishop Daniel Henry Mueggenborg, and others.

Notes 
Levit thus became the first woman to lead the school in its history.

References

External links
 
 Tulsa Golden Hurricane Athletics website

1894 establishments in Oklahoma Territory
American Athletic Conference schools
Buildings and structures in Tulsa, Oklahoma
Cultural institutions in Tulsa, Oklahoma
Educational institutions established in 1894
Private universities in Oklahoma
Tourist attractions in Tulsa, Oklahoma
Universities and colleges affiliated with the Presbyterian Church (USA)
Universities and colleges in Tulsa, Oklahoma